Calliteara fortunata is a moth of the family Erebidae first described by Alois Friedrich Rogenhofer in 1891. It is found on the Canary Islands.

The wingspan is 35–45 for males and 43–60 mm for females.

The larvae feed on Pinus canariensis, Adenocarpus foliolosus and Myrica faya.

References

External links
 "Calliteara fortunata (Rogenhofer, 1891)". Lepiforum e. V. With images. 

Moths described in 1891
Lymantriinae
Moths of Africa